Here We Go is a 2022 British sitcom created and written by Tom Basden for the BBC, starring Jim Howick, Katherine Parkinson, Alison Steadman and Tori Allen-Martin alongside Basden. The pilot episode, originally titled Pandemonium, was broadcast on 30 December 2020, commissioned as part of the long-running Comedy Playhouse strand.

In February 2023, the show was recommissioned for two further series.

Premise 
From the point of view of the handheld camera of teenager Sam, and flashbacks to less chaotic times, the dysfunctional and irrational Jessop family's trials and tribulations are documented in a raw, uncompromising, mortifying way.

Cast

Main 
 Jim Howick as Paul Jessop, Sam and Amy's hapless, uncool father, and Rachel’s husband
 Katherine Parkinson as Rachel Jessop, Sam and Amy's neurotic mother, Robin's sister, and Paul's wife
 Alison Steadman as Sue Jessop, Paul's jovial mother
 Tom Basden as Robin, Rachel's downtrodden brother
 Tori Allen-Martin as Cherry, Robin's vain fiancée
 Freya Parks as Amy Jessop, Paul and Rachel's sardonic daughter, Sam's sister, and Maya's girlfriend
 Mica Ricketts as Maya, Amy's boring and untrustworthy girlfriend 
 Jack Christou (2020) and Jude Collie (2022-) as Sam Jessop, Paul and Rachel's stoic son, Amy's brother and the cameraman

Recurring and guest 
Ed Kear as Dean, Robin's surly mate
Katy Wix as Kim Sinclair, a classmate of Rachel's from school (episode 2)
Mark Williams as Frank, a local painter with a conceited attitude towards his art (episode 3)
Tim Key as Ray, a former Olympic teammate of Paul's (episode 4)
Vincent Riotta as Alf, Sue's new boyfriend who's unenthusiastic about how she treats their relationship (episode 5)
Camille Ucan as Diane, an estate agent suspicious of Paul's undercover activities (episode 5)
Ninette Finch as Bren, a reticent friend of Sue's (episode 5)
Mark Cox as a policeman (episode 6)
Gia Hunter as Leah, a potential love interest of Sam (episode 6)

Episodes

Pilot (2020)

Series 1 (2022)

Series 2 (2023) 
A second series of seven episodes will air later in 2023.

Series 3 
A third series of seven episodes will air at an unknown date.

Production

Pandemonium 
The show's pilot, Pandemonium, was confirmed as part of the announcement of the BBC's 2020 Christmas slate of programming in November 2020, having been commissioned earlier that autumn.

The pilot was shot over six days, and involved finding crew that were experienced in dealing with COVID precautions, which producer Tom Jordan admitted was initially difficult due to the amount of productions that were restarting at the time of filming; he said that a crew "who had worked on Covid-safe sets before was very helpful indeed as the masks and social distancing was second nature to them". Cast and crew were subject to a 'coloured band system', with different colour bands assigned to different members to ascribe how stringent COVID testing and precautions they should be subjected to. Cast and crew "wore masks at all times" and had their temperatures checked each day by COVID supervisors.

The show being filmed from the perspective of the Jessops' teenage son, Sam, and his handheld camera, meant that the scene at the end of the pilot involving the crashing of the family's car off a cliff onto the beach below would only have one take available, and "required incredibly detailed planning for weeks before". Director Ella Jones said this way of filming was something the crew "wanted to embrace", but had to balance the "home-video look" with ensuring it worked well with "comedic timing", and the expectations of the "broad BBC1 audience" meaning the show needed to be "both distinctive but also accessible". This meant "second camera perspective[s]" were added into the narrative at some points that were not as restrictive to what the audience saw, with the aim overall for "choreographed chaos" to "create something that felt amateur and spontaneous, thus enabling our audience to believe the home video conceit but not be distracted by it".

Here We Go 
The pilot's commission to series was announced in November 2021. Basden explained that the premise of the series was inspired by his grandfather filming their family holidays as a child, and the "videos were often very funny by accident", and that he "liked the idea of a family talking to the camera and being aware that they were being filmed as it puts them under even more pressure to project positivity while everything is going wrong around them". He said that he had "wanted to write a sitcom about a family going on holiday for some time, as I think there's something really funny and high stakes about people under pressure to have a good time together, and the stress and anger this tends to produce instead".

The show's production team won an award at the Broadcast Tech Innovation Awards in 2022, with the Excellence in Audio Post-Production (Scripted) being awarded to Joe Cochrane and Elliot Bowell of Splice, who did post-production for Here We Go.

Reception

Viewership 
The first series averaged 1.4 million viewers on the night of broadcast, rising to 1.7 million with on-demand viewership.

Critical reception 
Flora Carr reviewing on behalf of the Radio Times called the pilot episode "a lockdown comedy special with gallows humour" and gave it three stars out of five, while Ed Cumming for The Independent called it "a valiant effort at exploring our current predicament" and gave it four out of five stars.

Rachel Sigee, reviewing for iNews gave series 1 four out of five stars. Benji Wilson for The Telegraph rated the series five stars out of five.

Broadcasts Miriam McHugh said the show was "a criminally underrated gem" that "didn't get the credit due when it was released, but is an entertaining entrant to the mockumentary canon".

References

External links

2020 British television series debuts
2020 television specials
2020s British sitcoms
2020s British LGBT-related comedy television series
BBC television sitcoms
British LGBT-related sitcoms
English-language television shows
Television series about dysfunctional families
Television series about marriage
Television series about siblings
Television shows set in London
Television shows about the COVID-19 pandemic